HOFELE-Design GmbHis a specialist German tuning company for Mercedes-Benz.

History 

Founded in 1983 and is now located in Sindelfingen, Germany. HOFELE-Design GmbH was appointed by Mercedes-Benz AG as a contractual partner for the ‘tuning’ of Mercedes-Benz passenger cars in 2018.

Operations 
HOFELE-Design through is tuning contract with Mercedes-Benz AG supply and modify the complete range of Mercedes-Benz passenger cars.

HOFELE-Design models 
 Mercedes-Benz Maybach : HOFELE based on Mercedes-Benz Maybach, X222 Facelift
 Mercedes-Benz S-Class: HOFELE based on Mercedes-Benz S-Class, W/V 222 Facelift
 Mercedes-Benz GLS: HOFELE based on Mercedes-Benz GLS, X 166 Facelift
 Mercedes-Benz G-Class: HOFELE based on Mercedes-Benz G-Class, W 463 new model 2018
 Mercedes-Benz GLE: HOFELE based on Mercedes-Benz GLE-Coupé-Class, C 292
 Mercedes-Benz GLC: HOFELE based on Mercedes-Benz GLC-Coupé-Class, C 253
 Mercedes-Benz GLA-Class: HOFELE based on Mercedes-Benz GLA-Class SUV, X 156
 Mercedes-Benz CLS-Class: HOFELE based on Mercedes-Benz CLS-Class C 257
 Mercedes-Benz E-Class: HOFELE based on Mercedes-Benz E-Class, 2016-, W 2013
 Mercedes-Benz C-Class: HOFELE based on Mercedes-Benz C-Class 2018-, W 205
 Mercedes-Benz CLA: HOFELE based on Mercedes-Benz CLA-Class C 117
 Mercedes-Benz A-Class: HOFELE based on Mercedes-Benz A-Class 2018-, W 177

Records 
HOFELE-Design is recognised by SAE International as a vehicle manufacturer and has been awarded a Worldwide Manufacturers Identification (WMI) Code by the Kraftfahrt-Bundesamt (KBA).

In 2010, European Motor Magazine Publisher has given HOFELE-Design a “Sport Auto” Award with the “SR8” – Concept, based on Audi A8. 
In the same year, Chamber of Commerce awarded HOFELE-Design to mark its 25 years of Export excellence to the World.

See also
 Mercedes-Benz
 Daimler AG
 Maybach
 Carlsson
 Brabus
 Renntech
 Lorinser
 Styling Garage
 Kleemann
 Alpina
 ABT
 Horch
 Mansory
 Scaldarsi Emperor

References

External links
 

Car brands
Mercedes-Benz
Auto tuning companies
Automotive companies established in 1983
Auto parts suppliers of Germany
Automotive motorsports and performance companies
Multinational companies
German brands
Car manufacturers of Germany
Cars of Germany
Luxury motor vehicle manufacturers